Nütterden is a village in the municipality of Kranenburg, Kreis Kleve in the German State of North Rhine-Westphalia.

Noted structure

A noted structure in the village is the St. Antoniuskirche, executed in Neo-Gothic style, the tower of which is conspicuous in the locally flat landscape. In 1853 a structure replaced a smaller chapel dating from the 15th century.

See also
 Kranenburg, North Rhine-Westphalia#Towns and villages in the municipality
 Kleve (district)#Towns and municipalities

Villages in North Rhine-Westphalia